The Naughton Gallery at Queen's, also known as The Naughton Gallery, is an art gallery and museum at Queen's University Belfast, Northern Ireland. Opened in 2001, the gallery is named after its benefactors, Martin and Carmel Naughton, who donated £500,000 to the university in 2002. Located on the first floor of the Queen's University's Lanyon building, the gallery displays six exhibitions per year presenting local and international contemporary artists. Among the talks and events organised in conjunction with the exhibitions, the Naughton Gallery occasionally organises screenings with the Queen's Film Theatre, which is also a cultural institution under the auspices of Queen's University.

See also

Queen's University Belfast
Queen's Film Theatre
Belfast International Arts Festival
Brian Friel Theatre
 Ulster Museum

References

External links
The Naughton Gallery at Queen's

Art museums and galleries in Northern Ireland
Museums in Belfast
Queen's University Belfast
University museums in the United Kingdom
Tourist attractions in Belfast
Art museums established in 2001
2001 establishments in Northern Ireland